

The Edgars Creek Trail is a shared use path for cyclists and pedestrians in the suburb of Thomastown, an inner northern suburb of Melbourne, Victoria.

It leads to the historic village of Westgarthtown.

Following the Path
The path is signed on the Western Ring Road Trail. Leaving the Western Ring Road Trail the trail immediately degenerates into a goat track beside Edgars Creek. On the north side of Spring St a private property blocks the path. Further to the north and about 1 km later, it returns to a decent concrete path.

Connections
Dead end in the north at German Lane. Western Ring Road Trail in the south.

References

Bike paths in Melbourne